Nariño is a town and municipality in the Colombian department of Antioquia. Part of the subregion of Eastern Antioquia.

Climate
Nariño has a cool tropical rainforest climate (Af) due to altitude with heavy to very heavy rainfall year-round.

References

Municipalities of Antioquia Department